Eucereon myrtusa is a moth of the subfamily Arctiinae. It was described by Herbert Druce in 1884. It is found in Mexico and Costa Rica.

References

 

myrtusa
Moths described in 1884